Brazilian Classics is a compilation album by Brazilian jazz pianist Eliane Elias. It was recorded from December 1989 to October 1997 and initially released on September 16, 2003 by Blue Note. The release contains 16 songs taken from her previous eight studio albums. The album was re-released in 2006.

Reception 
Matt Collar of AllMusic stated, "While it would have been nice for Blue Note to include some rarities or alternate takes, as it stands Brazilian Classics works as a fitting representation of Elias' take on her home country's unique sound." Joshua Weiner writing for All About Jazz commented, "...Brazilian Classics is an appealing listen, thematically unified and impeccably produced. The hardcore jazz fan may do better with Elias's Plays Jobim album, from which many of the best tracks with Gomez and DeJohnette are taken. But bossa nova fanatics, or maybe those wishing for a warm Brazilian breeze in the dead of winter, will enjoy this generous selection of Elias's work."

Track listing

References

External links 

2003 albums
Eliane Elias albums
2000 albums
Blue Note Records albums
Vocal jazz albums